Nanshan Boulevard (Chinese:南山大道) is a major thoroughfare in Nanshan, Shenzhen, China. It runs from Zhongshanyuan Road in the north to Dongbin Road in the south. The road is 5.4 kilometers long.

Major intersections 
Beihuan Boulevard
Shennan Road
Binhai Boulevard and Guimiao Road (Intersection)
Dongbin Road

References 

Roads in Shenzhen